Grace Episcopal Church is a historic church at 203 Main Street in Rosedale, Mississippi.

It was built in 1879 and added to the National Register of Historic Places in 1980.

References

Episcopal church buildings in Mississippi
Churches on the National Register of Historic Places in Mississippi
Carpenter Gothic church buildings in Mississippi
Churches completed in 1879
19th-century Episcopal church buildings
National Register of Historic Places in Bolivar County, Mississippi
Rosedale, Mississippi